The 2020 Úrvalsdeild kvenna was the 49th season of the women's association football highest division league in Iceland.Due to the effects of the COVID-19 pandemic the season started late on 12 June 2020.
Valur were the defending champions after claiming the 2019 championship.

On 30 October 2020, due to the COVID-19 pandemic, the season was abandoned with just two rounds of matches left to be played. Breiðablik were declared champions, claiming their 18th Úrvalsdeild championship. The top two teams of the league at the time of the abandonment based on the average number of points per game played, Breiðablik and Valur, were selected to play in the 2021–22 UEFA Women's Champions League by the Football Association of Iceland, likewise the last two teams relegating to the 1.deild kvenna.

Teams
The 2020 Úrvalsdeild kvenna was contested by 10 teams, eight of which played in the division the previous season and two promoted from the 2019 1. deild kvenna. The bottom two teams from the previous season, Keflavík and HK/Vikingur were relegated to the 1. deild kvenna and were replaced by Þróttur and FH, the winner and runners-up of the 2019 1. deild kvenna respectively.

Source: Scoresway

League table

Results

Top goalscorers

References

External links
 

Isl
1
2020
Association football events curtailed due to the COVID-19 pandemic